Jelapang LRT station is an elevated Light Rail Transit (LRT) station on the Bukit Panjang LRT line in Bukit Panjang, Singapore, located along Bukit Panjang Ring Road, near the junctions of Senja Link and Jelapang Road.

The station is located near Jelapang Road. Jelapang means "granary" or "rice bowl" in Malay.

Greenridge Shopping Centre an Zhenghua Secondary School are in the vicinity.

Incidents
On 15 January 2000, See Chau Lai, a hawker assistant, died after he was hit by a train near Jelapang Station of the same LRT line. A coroner's inquiry found that he walked along the tracks after having too much to drink.

References

External links

Railway stations in Singapore opened in 1999
Bukit Panjang
LRT stations of Bukit Panjang LRT Line
Light Rail Transit (Singapore) stations